Lineage 2: Revolution is a massively multiplayer online role-playing game (MMORPG) developed by Netmarble for mobile platforms under license from NCSoft, taking place 100 years before the events of NCSoft's Lineage II: Goddess of Destruction storyline. It is part of the Lineage series.

Gameplay 
Like many MMORPGs, the player starts by creating a character and choosing its race. Available races are: Human, Elf, Dark Elf, Dwarf, Orc and in the latest update, the Kamael. Each race specializes later in different classes, such as warrior, mage, and archer. The player progresses through the game by taking quests and killing mobs. The vast majority of the game, though, is afk grinding.

The game is set in the same world of Lineage II, originally released in 2003, and features instanced dungeons, player versus player (PvP), clan wars, raids and a series of quests to advance the story line. However, the gameplay has been specifically adapted to better fit mobile devices by Netmarble; for example, quests are automated, with the character executing them automatically and even killing enemies alone after selecting a quest.

Development 
Developed by South Korea's Netmarble, the game was first released in South Korea on November 14, 2016. It launched in western countries on November 15, 2017. The game was set to release in Japan in the third quarter of 2017, followed by China in the fourth.

Reception 

The game has been well received in some markets. By December 31, 2017, the game had crossed the  mark within 18 days. By January 14, 2017, the game had grossed  within its first month in South Korea. Overseas, it became the top-grossing app on Apple's App Store in Japan just 18 hours after its debut, and surpassed 1 million pre-registrations for the US and Europe launch, generating 45% of Netmarble's revenues . The game went on to gross  worldwide in 2017, becoming the year's seventh highest-grossing mobile game. , the game has more than 30million players. It grossed over  worldwide by January 2019, and has grossed  .

External links

References 

2016 video games
Active massively multiplayer online games
Android (operating system) games
IOS games
Lineage (series)
Massively multiplayer online role-playing games
NCSoft games
Unreal Engine games
Video game prequels
Video games developed in South Korea
Netmarble games